Shalka may refer to:
 Scream of the Shalka
 Shalka, Iran
 Shalka, Fuman, Iran
 Shalka (meteorite)